Rachel Newborough (born 19 November 1996) is a Northern Irish footballer who plays as a defender for Coventry United in the FA Women's Championship and has appeared for the Northern Ireland women's national team.

Club career

Doncaster Rovers Belles

Charlton Athletic
In July 2019, Newborough joined FA Women's Championship club Charlton Athletic. Two years later, she signed a professional contract with the club.

Coventry United
In January 2023, Newborough joined Coventry United after she departed Charlton Athletic by mutual consent.

International career
Newborough has been capped for the Northern Ireland national team, appearing for the team during the 2019 FIFA Women's World Cup qualifying cycle.

References

External links
 
 
 

1996 births
Living people
Women's association footballers from Northern Ireland
Northern Ireland women's international footballers
Women's association football defenders
Doncaster Rovers Belles L.F.C. players
Boston College Eagles women's soccer players
Charlton Athletic W.F.C. players
Coventry United W.F.C. players
Women's Championship (England) players
Women's Super League players